German submarine U-969 was a Type VIIC U-boat built for Nazi Germany's Kriegsmarine for service during World War II.
She was laid down on 29 May 1942 by Blohm & Voss, Hamburg as yard number 169, launched on 11 February 1943 and commissioned on 24 March 1943 under Leutnant zur See Max Dobbert.

Design
German Type VIIC submarines were preceded by the shorter Type VIIB submarines. U-969 had a displacement of  when at the surface and  while submerged. She had two shafts and two  propellers.

U-969 was fitted with five  torpedo tubes (four fitted at the bow and one at the stern), fourteen torpedoes, one  SK C/35 naval gun, 220 rounds, and one twin  C/30 anti-aircraft gun. The boat had a complement of between forty-four and sixty.

Service history
The boat's career began with training at 5th U-boat Flotilla on 24 March 1943, followed by active service on 1 October 1943 as part of the 7th Flotilla for the next five months. She transferred to 29th Flotilla, on 1 March 1944, based in La Spezia, for Mediterranean operations.

Wolfpacks
U-969 took part in seven wolfpacks, namely:
 Siegfried (22 – 27 October 1943)
 Siegfried 1 (27 – 30 October 1943)
 Körner (30 October – 2 November 1943)
 Tirpitz 2 (2 – 8 November 1943)
 Eisenhart 3 (9 – 15 November 1943)
 Schill 2 (17 – 22 November 1943)
 Weddigen (22 November – 4 December 1943)

Fate
U-969 was sunk on 6 August 1944 in the Military port of Toulon in position  in an air raid by US Liberator bombers.

Summary of raiding history

See also
 Mediterranean U-boat Campaign (World War II)

References

Bibliography

External links

German Type VIIC submarines
1943 ships
U-boats commissioned in 1943
U-boats sunk in 1944
U-boats sunk by US aircraft
World War II shipwrecks in the Mediterranean Sea
World War II submarines of Germany
Ships built in Hamburg
Maritime incidents in August 1944